Timothy Sinicki is an American college baseball coach, who has been the head coach of the Binghamton Bearcats since the start of the 1993 season.  Under Sinicki, Binghamton has appeared in two NCAA Division I Baseball Championships.

When Sinicki became Binghamton's head coach in 1993, the school competed in the NCAA Division III State University of New York Athletic Conference.  Under Sinicki, the Bearcats moved to Division II for the 1999 and 2000 seasons and Division I at the start of the 2001 season.  After spending 2001 in the New York State Baseball Conference, Binghamton joined the America East Conference for the 2002 season.  The program made its first Division I postseason appearance in the 2005 America East Tournament, where it was eliminated with consecutive losses to Northeastern and Vermont.  From 2007–2010, Sinicki led Binghamton to four consecutive regular season America East titles.  The team won the 2009 America East Tournament to advance to its first NCAA Tournament, where it won a game against George Mason.  Binghamton appeared in its second NCAA Tournament in 2013 after winning that season's America East Tournament.

Sinicki played four seasons of college baseball for three different programs: Binghamton (1985), Broome CC (1986), and Western Carolina (1987–1988).  A pitcher, Sinicki led Western Carolina in wins as a senior and appeared in both the 1987 and 1988 NCAA Tournaments. He was drafted by the Pittsburgh Pirates in Major League Baseball's winter draft in 1986, but he chose to finish college rather than sign a professional contract.

Head coaching record
Below is a table of Sinicki's yearly records as an NCAA head baseball coach.

See also
 List of current NCAA Division I baseball coaches

References

External links

Binghamton Bearcats bio

Living people
Year of birth missing (living people)
Binghamton Bearcats baseball coaches
Binghamton Bearcats baseball players
SUNY Broome Hornets baseball players
Western Carolina Catamounts baseball players
Baseball coaches from New York (state)
People from Johnson City, New York